Raphaël Burtin (born 9 February 1977) is a French former alpine skier who competed in the men's giant slalom at the 2006 Winter Olympics.

External links
 sports-reference.com
 

1977 births
Living people
French male alpine skiers
Olympic alpine skiers of France
Alpine skiers at the 2006 Winter Olympics
Place of birth missing (living people)
21st-century French people